Christie MacFadyen is a Canadian actress best known for appearing in the film The Top of His Head.

Selected filmography
 The Top of His Head (1989)
 Swoon (1992)
 Spare Me (1992)
 Left Behind: The Movie (2000)
 Clean Rite Cowboy (2000)
 Too Much Sex (2000)
 Left Behind II: Tribulation Force (2002)
 Ararat (2002)
 Good Fences (2003)

References

External links
 

Canadian film actresses
Canadian television actresses
Year of birth missing (living people)
Living people